is the twenty-fifth single of J-pop group Morning Musume. It also served as the last single of the last founding member of the group Kaori Iida.

It was released on January 19, 2005. There are two editions of the single. The limited edition was wrapped in a special package and had five photo cards with catalog number EPCE-5348. The regular edition has a catalog number EPCE-5349 and was contained with one photo card of the group on its first pressing. On the same date, the Single V DVD of the single was released. It is stated on the DVD that featured videos has an aspect image of 4:3, but are actually in widescreen.

Overview
The song was the first official cheer song of the Tohoku Rakuten Golden Eagles. It was written by producer Tsunku.

Track listings 
All lyrics are written by Tsunku.

CD 
 
 
 "The Manpower!!!" (Instrumental)

Single V DVD 
 "The Manpower!!!"
 "The Manpower!!! (Another Edition)"

Personnel
Kaori Iida – center vocals
Mari Yaguchi – center vocals
Rika Ishikawa – center vocals
Hitomi Yoshizawa – main vocals
Ai Takahashi – main vocals
Asami Konno – minor vocals
Makoto Ogawa – minor vocals
Risa Niigaki – center vocals
Miki Fujimoto – center vocals
Eri Kamei – minor vocals
Sayumi Michishige – minor vocals
Reina Tanaka – center vocals

Members at time of single 
1st generation: Kaori Iida 
2nd generation: Mari Yaguchi
4th generation: Rika Ishikawa, Hitomi Yoshizawa
5th generation: Ai Takahashi, Asami Konno, Makoto Ogawa, Risa Niigaki
6th generation: Miki Fujimoto, Eri Kamei, Sayumi Michishige, Reina Tanaka

Chart performance
 #4 Japan Oricon Charts
 #4 Japan CDTV

References

External links 
Up-Front Works Official Website: CD entry, DVD entry

2005 singles
2005 songs
Morning Musume songs
Baseball songs and chants
Fight songs
Zetima Records singles
Tohoku Rakuten Golden Eagles
Songs written by Tsunku
Song recordings produced by Tsunku